= Roshani Meche =

Nepalese politician

Honourable Roshani Meche

Member of Parliament for Nepal Communist Party
- Incumbent
- Assumed office 2026

Personal details
- Party: Nepal Communist Party
- Other party: Nepal Communist Party
- Children: 1

Roshani Meche is a Nepalese politician belonging to the Nepal Communist Party. She is currently serving as a member of the Federal Parliament of Nepal.
